Skyline is a 2010 American  science fiction disaster film directed by Greg and Colin Strause and co-produced and written by Liam O'Donnell. It stars Eric Balfour, Scottie Thompson, Brittany Daniel, Crystal Reed, David Zayas, and Donald Faison as a group of Los Angeles residents who witness an alien invasion while in a condominium.

The film was released on November 12, 2010, in the United States. Despite negative reviews from critics, Skyline was a box office success, grossing $68 million worldwide against its $10–20 million budget.

Skyline was followed by two sequels: Beyond Skyline (2017) and Skylines (2020); both were written and directed by O'Donnell and produced by O'Donnell, the Strause brothers and Matthew E. Chausse.

Plot

Jarrod and his wife Elaine arrive in Los Angeles, California for Jarrod's best friend Terry's birthday party. They celebrate with Terry's wife, Candice, and his assistant, Denise. During a private argument about whether or not they should move, Elaine reveals she is pregnant.

The next morning, blue lights descend from the sky, hypnotizing anyone who looks at them. Every hypnotized person becomes zombie-like and immobilized, and are then collected by the light machines. This is the work of several alien ships that descend from the sky. Jarrod is about to be taken when Terry tackles him. The two escape the alien drones and meet up with Elaine.

Back in the condominium, Terry looks for his neighbor Walt so they can all leave in Walt's car. As Terry and Walt are hiding, Walt's dog runs towards the creature. Walt tries to stop it and gets abducted. Jarrod believes the open water would be a safer place, since there are no machines over the sea. They encounter a bickering couple, Colin and Jen, also preparing to flee the building. As Terry's car exits the garage, it is flattened by a massive four-legged alien, killing Denise. Terry escapes, but is abducted as he flees. The trio retreat into the garage. There they encounter another alien lifeform in the shape of a large multi-tentacled squid that corners the rest of the group before the building's concierge, Oliver, slams into it with an SUV. In the ensuing fight, the squid creature sucks out Colin's brain to replace its own brain. Jen joins the group, but is abducted as they run back into the building. The four survivors remain hiding in the condominium.

The next day, the United States Air Force launches an attack against the alien spaceship and flying alien drones using stealth unmanned combat aerial vehicles and conventional drone aircraft. Only one stealth plane pierces the carnage and fires a nuclear missile, hitting the mothership, before it is destroyed. The detonation blows the ship apart. Unfortunately, the aliens survive and the ship slowly begins to repair itself. After Jarrod tells Elaine that the alien light made him feel powerful, he is adamant that safety must be found outside. Oliver wants to stay inside and tries restraining him. Jarrod physically starts changing, lifts Oliver off the floor and vows to protect his family.

A US Navy fleet arrives off the coast, and helicopters land soldiers on nearby rooftops. Jarrod and Elaine go to the roof hoping to catch a ride to safety. Oliver and Candice stay in the condominium but are found when Candice accidentally exposes herself to the light and is abducted by a squid alien, with both being blown up by soldiers on a nearby roof soon after. Afterwards, Oliver attempts to kill a tanker alien by turning on a gas stove and igniting a lighter, causing the room to explode. The soldiers are thrown off the roof by the aliens and a squid alien attacks Jarrod and Elaine. The badly injured Jarrod kills it. The couple accepts their fate, looks into the blue light, and are sucked into the mother ship. The naval vessels off the coast are shown burning and sinking. A brief montage of cities such as London, Las Vegas, Hong Kong and New York City shows that have all succumbed to the invasion and the aliens appear to have won.

Inside the alien ship, Elaine wakes on a pile of human bodies. Tubes are sucking human brains into machines. Probes go through the pile looking for what they can find. Elaine sees Jarrod in the pile but has to watch helplessly as his brain is removed. She is probed and transported to a chamber with other pregnant women. She watches as another pregnant woman has her baby removed and dies. Meanwhile, Jarrod's brain, glowing red, is inserted into a new alien body. Animating the body, Jarrod seems to retain control and comes to the aid of Elaine, who recognizes him when he caresses her belly and her head. He then turns around to confront advancing aliens. In the credits, a series of still images depict "Jarrod" protecting Elaine and their child from the aliens.

Cast
 Eric Balfour as Jarrod
 Scottie Thompson as Elaine
 Brittany Daniel as Candice
 Crystal Reed as Denise
 Neil Hopkins as Ray
 David Zayas as Oliver
 Donald Faison as Terry
 Robin Gammell as Walt
 Tanya Newbould as Jen
 J. Paul Boehmer as Colin

Production
The project began filming in Marina Del Rey in February 2010 through March 31. Most of the action was shot in the high-rise condo in which Greg Strause lives.

The physical production cost only $500,000. With all the visual effects the total budget was around $10–20 million.

On November 11, 2010, producer Brett Ratner said on the Opie and Anthony Show that the film cost $10 million to make. The Brothers Strause insisted that they would film a sequel with their own money and try to find a distributor to release it.

Legal action from Sony
In August 2010 it was reported that Sony Pictures Entertainment was contemplating legal action against the Strause brothers, the directors of Skyline, and the owners of Hydraulx Filmz. Sony paid Hydraulx to generate visual effects work for Battle: Los Angeles. But Hydraulx never informed Sony the siblings were directing a rival alien invasion feature, similarly driven by special effects, scheduled for release four months prior to Sony's feature. A representative for the Strauses issued a statement: "Any claims of impropriety are completely baseless. This is a blatant attempt by Sony to force these independent filmmakers to move a release date that has long been set by Universal and Relativity and is outside the filmmakers' control".

On March 17, 2011, Sony released a statement dismissing its arbitration against Hydraulx and the Strause Brothers, saying that after the discovery phase they were satisfied that none of the Battle: Los Angeles visual effects were used in Skyline. The Strause brothers stated, “We’re glad to put this behind us. We’ve been honored to work on several wonderful SPE projects in the past and look forward to future collaborations.”

Music
Composer Matthew Margeson is a colleague of Brian Tyler, who served as one of the film's executive producers.

Release
The film was released on November 12, 2010, in North America and November 11 in Australia, and was distributed by Universal Pictures. Following the theatrical release, the movie was to run on Netflix. A trailer was released August 13 and attached to Scott Pilgrim vs. the World and  Devil. The second trailer was released on September 29 and then attached to My Soul to Take on October 15. Another trailer was also attached to Paranormal Activity 2. The trailer has also been attached to Red and Jackass 3D in the United Kingdom and Canada.

Reception

Critical response
Skyline was not screened for critics prior to its release in the United States. When it was released, it was panned by critics. Review aggregation website Rotten Tomatoes gives the film an approval rating of 16% based on 81 reviews, with an average rating of 3.6/10. The site's critical consensus reads, "A middling sci-fi entry, Skyline offers proof that solid special effects alone cannot overcome a flat storyline filled with uninspired dialogue." On Metacritic the film has a weighted average score of 26 out of 100, based on 18 critics, indicating "generally unfavorable reviews". Audiences polled by CinemaScore gave the film an average grade of "D−" on an A+ to F scale.

Writing in Variety, Joe Leydon panned the film: "Imagine a Kmart mash-up of Transformers and Independence Day and you're appropriately primed for Skyline, an underwhelming and derivative sci-fi thriller that's only marginally more impressive than a run-of-the-mill SyFy Channel telepic." Michael Philips of the Chicago Tribune wrote that the "effects are pretty good, on a fairly limited budget. And that's about all you can say for Skyline." Screen Rant's Ben Kendrick wrote that the film "comes across as a big-screen B-movie with a convoluted plot and too limited of a scope to make the audience feel the worldwide alien-apocalypse that’s supposedly unfolding in the film". In the New York Times, Mike Hale concluded, "it turns out that all the running and hiding and chopping (there’s an axe) was beside the point, which is the sort of thing that can make you angry if you care about the characters, but in this case is kind of a relief."

There were some positive reviews, including Matthew Sorrento's at Film Threat, who commented, "Skyline, if not always successful, refashions the modern alien invasion motif as the hopeless siege that it should be." Kim Newman from Empire Magazine also endorsed the film, writing, "... delivers all the Saturday night whiz-bang and Sunday morning brain-ripping you could want."

Box office
Skyline opened on November 12, 2010, and grossed $4,737,555 on its opening day from 2,880 theaters for a 1-day average of $1,645 per theater. It grossed a total of $11,692,415 over its opening weekend from 2,880 theaters for a 3-day average of $4,060 per theater, and ranking No. 4 for the weekend behind Megamind at No. 1, Unstoppable at No. 2, and Due Date at No. 3.  , the film made $21,416,355 in the United States and $46,848,618 internationally for a worldwide total of $68,264,973.

Home media
Skyline was released on Blu-ray and DVD on March 22, 2011.

Sequels

In May 2014 at the annual Cannes Film Festival, it was revealed that a sequel titled Beyond Skyline was planned to go into production, but without the Strause brothers as the writers and directors. Instead, Skyline producer and co-writer Liam O'Donnell was brought on board, marking his directorial debut. The film was released in the United States on December 15, 2017.

The third film in the trilogy, Skylines, was released on December 18, 2020.

See also

 List of films featuring drones
 List of films featuring extraterrestrials

References

External links

 
 

2010 action thriller films
2010 science fiction action films
2010 films
2010s science fiction thriller films
Alien abduction films
Alien invasions in films
American action thriller films
American science fiction action films
American science fiction thriller films
2010s English-language films
Films about extraterrestrial life
Films scored by Matthew Margeson
Films set in Los Angeles
Films shot in California
Films shot in Los Angeles
Rogue (company) films
Relativity Media films
Universal Pictures films
2010s American films